Costoya is a place in the municipality of Villanueva, Lalín, Pontevedra, Spain.

External links
El Concello de Lalín reclama al Adif la reparación de un camino en Costoya

Municipalities in the Province of Pontevedra